This is a complete list of ice hockey players who have played for the Barys Astana in the Kontinental Hockey League (KHL). It includes players that have played at least one match, either in the KHL regular season or in the KHL playoffs. Players with names in bold type are current players on the team. Statistics are complete to the beginning of the 2013–14 season.

References